The federal secretary (also referred to as the secretary to the Government of Pakistan) is the highest-ranking position in the Government of Pakistan, occupied by the most senior civil servant in a specific ministry or division. The secretary is the administrative head of that ministry or division and oversees and enforces public policy matters. The authority for the creation of this post solely rests with the Cabinet of Pakistan. The position holder is a BPS-22 grade officer, usually belonging to the Pakistan Administrative Service.

All promotions and appointments to this rank and post are directly made by the prime minister of Pakistan. The post of federal secretary is equivalent to that of chief secretary of a provincial government (within their respective provinces) and to the rank of General in the Pakistan Army, Air Marshal in the Pakistan Air Force, and Admiral in the Pakistan Navy.

Due to the importance of their respective assignments, there are twelve specific federal secretaries which are considered to be the most vital in the Government of Pakistan. These include the establishment secretary (responsible for civil service matters), finance secretary (responsible for the country's treasury), secretary to the prime minister (responsible for Prime Minister's Office), cabinet secretary (responsible for the Cabinet Division), interior secretary (responsible for law and order), commerce secretary (responsible for trade), foreign secretary (responsible for foreign relations), maritime secretary (responsible for ports and shipping), power secretary (responsible for the electricity and power sector), planning and development secretary (responsible for development projects), petroleum secretary (responsible for the petroleum sector), and industry secretary (responsible for industrial development).

Powers and responsibilities 
The federal secretary is the administrative head of the ministry or division, and oversees all matters of policy and administration within the ministry or /division.

The role of secretary is as follows:
 To act as the administrative head of the ministry or division. The responsibility in this regard is complete and undivided.
 To act as the chief adviser to the prime minister on all aspects of policy and administrative affairs.
 To represent the ministry or division before the Standing Committees of the Parliament.

Perception and image
The federal secretaries are the most senior and experienced officers in the country and are largely considered to be the most powerful individuals in the government. Promotion to the rank of federal secretary is regarded as a very tough task given the high level of scrutiny taken into place when the promotions are done by the High Powered Selection Board (HPSB) which is chaired by the prime minister. As the career service of federal secretaries and other bureaucrats are immune to the transition of political governments, they are seen as the real policy-makers who govern the country and serve as the spinal cord for the establishment.

Federal secretary slots
Cabinet Secretary of Pakistan
Principal Secretary to the President of Pakistan
Principal Secretary to the Prime Minister of Pakistan
Establishment Secretary of Pakistan
Foreign Secretary of Pakistan
Interior Secretary of Pakistan
Finance Secretary of Pakistan
Pakistan Secretary of Economic Affairs
Maritime Secretary of Pakistan
Commerce Secretary of Pakistan
Petroleum Secretary of Pakistan
Power Secretary of Pakistan
Planning and Development Secretary of Pakistan
Information Secretary of Pakistan
Pakistan Secretary of Defence
Pakistan Secretary of Water Resources
Pakistan Secretary of Health
Pakistan Secretary of Information Technology
Pakistan Secretary of Communications
Pakistan Secretary of Education
National Security Division Secretary
Pakistan Secretary of Industries and Production
Pakistan Secretary of Law
Aviation Secretary of Pakistan
Secretary Revenue Division of Pakistan

Notable federal secretaries
Roedad Khan
Nargis Sethi
Tariq Bajwa
Shehzad Arbab
Usman Ali Isani
Nasir Mahmood Khosa
Rizwan Ahmed
Azam Suleman Khan
Syed Abu Ahmad Akif
Naveed Kamran Baloch
Babar Yaqoob Fateh Muhammad
Maroof Afzal
Shoaib Mir Memon
Mir Ahmed Bakhsh Lehri
Sardar Ahmad Nawaz Sukhera
Muhammad Sualeh Ahmad Faruqi
Sajjad Saleem Hotiana
Raja Muhammad Abbas
Mumtaz Ali Shah
Kamran Rasool
Allah Bakhsh Malik
Arshad Sami Khan
Irfan Ali
Shahjehan Syed Karim
Kamran Lashari
Jawad Rafique Malik
Sikandar Sultan Raja
Qudrat Ullah Shahab
Iqbal Hussain Durrani
Ghulam Ishaq Khan
Tasneem Noorani
Fawad Hasan Fawad
Rabiya Javeri Agha
Aftab Ghulam Nabi Kazi

References 

Civil service of Pakistan
Government of Pakistan